Cem Gezinci (born 1 September 1985 in Istanbul, Turkey) is a Turkish wheelchair basketball player and Paralympian. He is a 4.5 point player competing for Beşiktaş, and is part of Turkey men's national wheelchair basketball team.

Cem plays in the national team, which qualified to the 2016 Summer Paralympics in Rio de Janeiro, Brazil.

Career history
He played in the national team, which ranked eight at the 2010 Wheelchair Basketball World Championship held in Birmingham, United Kingdom .

At the 2012 Summer Paralympics, the national team he was part of, ranked 7th.

At the 2014  World Championships in Incheon, South Korea the national team he was part of, scored the bronze medal.

Achievements

References

1985 births
Living people
Sportspeople from Istanbul
Turkish men's wheelchair basketball players
Paralympic wheelchair basketball players of Turkey
Wheelchair basketball players at the 2012 Summer Paralympics
Beşiktaş JK wheelchair basketball players
Galatasaray S.K. (wheelchair basketball) players
Forwards (basketball)